Vatovavy is a region of Madagascar. Its capital is Mananjary. It was created by dividing the former region of Vatovavy-Fitovinany on 16 June 2021.

Cyclone Batsirai made landfall at Mananjary in 2022, leaving 90 percent of the city destroyed.

Administrative divisions
Vatovavy Region is divided into three districts, which are sub-divided into 58 communes.

 Ifanadiana District - 14 communes
 Mananjary District - 25 communes
 Nosy Varika District - 19 communes

Transportation 
Train - 180 km (from Fianarantsoa)
Car Taxi-Brousse
 One airport: Mananjary Airport

Rivers
 the Namorona River

Protected areas
Part of Ranomafana National Park

References

Vatovavy
Regions of Madagascar